BAPE (or A Bathing Ape) is a Japanese clothing company.

BAPE may also refer to:
Basic Alpha PinPad Encryptor, used on ATM machines to encrypt the cardholder's personal identification number (PIN)